Tallapudi is a village in West Godavari district of the Indian state of Andhra Pradesh. It is located on the bank of the Godavari River.

Demographics
According to Indian census, 2011, the demographic details of Tallapudi village is as follows:
 Total Population: 	4,411	in 1,151 Households
 Male Population: 	2,242	and Female Population: 	2,169
 Children Under 6-years of age: 480	(Boys 	247 and Girls - 233)
 Total Literates: 	3,337

References 

Villages in West Godavari district